= William Jordan Rattray =

Canadian journalist

- Born: 1835; London, England
- Died: 26 September 1883 (aged 47–48); Toronto, Ontario
- Occupations: journalist and author

William Jordan Rattray (1835 – 26 September 1883) was a Canadian journalist.

Rattray was born in London, England. His father was Scottish. Rattray went to Canada with his parents in 1848, and they settled in Toronto, where he graduated from the University of Toronto in 1858. William's first essays in the literary field were printed in the Toronto Grumbler. He engaged in journalism as an editorial writer on the Toronto Mail. He also contributed to the Canadian Monthly and other periodicals and established a reputation as an able defender of Christianity against agnosticism. He wrote The Scot in British North America (4 vols., Toronto, 1883).
